The Vaxell 60i is a Polish aircraft engine, designed and produced by Vaxell of Bydgoszcz for use in ultralight and homebuilt aircraft.

Design and development
The Vaxell 60i engine is a four-cylinder four-stroke, horizontally-opposed,  displacement, air-cooled, direct-drive, gasoline engine design. It employs dual electronic ignition, electronic, multipoint fuel injection and produces  at 3200 rpm.

Specifications (60i)

See also

References

External links

Vaxell aircraft engines
Air-cooled aircraft piston engines
2000s aircraft piston engines